110393 Rammstein, provisional designation , is a background asteroid from the central region of the asteroid belt, approximately 4 kilometers in diameter. It was discovered on 11 October 2001, by French astronomer Jean-Claude Merlin at the Le Creusot Observatory in France. The asteroid was named after the German industrial metal band Rammstein.

Orbit and classification 

Rammstein is a non-family asteroid from the main belt's background population. It orbits the Sun in the central asteroid belt at a distance of 2.5–2.9 AU once every 4 years and 6 months (1,630 days; semi-major axis of 2.71 AU). Its orbit has an eccentricity of 0.09 and an inclination of 12° with respect to the ecliptic.

The body's observation arc begins with its first observation made by LONEOS at Lowell Observatory in September 2001, less than a month prior to its official discovery observation at Le Creusot.

Physical characteristics 

The asteroid's spectral type is unknown.

Diameter and albedo 

Rammstein has not been observed by any of the space-based surveys such as the Infrared Astronomical Satellite IRAS, the Japanese Akari satellite or the NEOWISE mission of NASA's Wide-field Infrared Survey Explorer. Based on a generic magnitude-to-diameter conversion, the asteroid measures 3.0 and 5.5 kilometers in diameter based on an absolute magnitude of 15.0 and a geometric albedo of 0.20 and 0.06, which roughly correspond to a body of carbonaceous and stony composition, respectively (both types are common in the central asteroid belt). The Minor Planet Center (MPC) similarly estimates the object's mean-diameter to be between 3 and 6 kilometers.

Rotation period 

As of 2018, no rotational lightcurve of Rammstein has been obtained from photometric observations. The body's rotation period, shape and poles remain unknown.

Naming 

This minor planet was named after the German NDH-Metal band Rammstein, which in turn took its name from the city of Ramstein after the tragic 1988 air show disaster at Ramstein Air Base (also see Ramstein air show disaster). The official naming citation was published by the MPC on 19 February 2006.

References

External links 
 Further information about the observatory
 
 

110393
Discoveries by Jean-Claude Merlin
Named minor planets
110393 Rammstein
20011011